Amen is the second single on Halestorm's third studio album Into the Wild Life.

Composition
Frontwoman Lzzy Hale has stated in interviews that the song is about personal freedom to do whatever you want.

Music video
The music video was released on March 2, 2015.

Chart positions
The song was their third number-one on the Mainstream Rock chart, allowing them to tie with The Pretty Reckless to have the most number-ones on that chart by a band led by a female vocalist.

References

2015 songs
Atlantic Records singles
Halestorm songs
Songs about freedom
Songs written by Lzzy Hale
Songs written by Scott Stevens (singer)